Vyacheslav Melnikov (born 12 March 1975) is a retired Russian professional footballer.

Honours

Individual
 Malaysia Super League Top goalscorer: 1998

References

External links
 Pahang ditawarkan AS$1/2j untuk dapatkan Melnikov
  Penang may have “Russian Torpedo” Viatcheslav Melnikov
 Melnikov gets his break
 Melnikov heading for Korea
 Melnikov off-target, but still a hit
 Melnikov gets nod despite passport hitch
 Melnikov finds his killer touch just in time

1975 births
Living people
Russian footballers
Liga Leumit players
Russian Premier League players
Russian expatriate footballers
Expatriate footballers in Israel
Expatriate footballers in Turkey
Expatriate footballers in Malaysia
Expatriate footballers in Hong Kong
Expatriate footballers in Vietnam
FC Chernomorets Novorossiysk players
PFC CSKA Moscow players
Hapoel Haifa F.C. players
Hapoel Rishon LeZion F.C. players
Hapoel Beit She'an F.C. players
Hapoel Bat Yam F.C. players
MKE Ankaragücü footballers
Happy Valley AA players
Penang F.C. players
Sri Pahang FC players
Russian expatriate sportspeople in Hong Kong
Russian expatriate sportspeople in Israel
Russian expatriate sportspeople in Malaysia
Russian expatriate sportspeople in Turkey
Russian expatriate sportspeople in Vietnam
Association football forwards